Camelford Football Club is a football club based in Camelford, Cornwall, England.

History
The club was established in 1893 and played in the Cornwall Senior League until joining the South Western League in 1955. However, after finishing bottom of the table in 1961–62 and 1962–63 they dropped into the East Cornwall Premier League, taking the place of their reserve team.

In 2007 the club were founder members of the South West Peninsula League, joining Division One West. After winning the division in 2010–11 they were promoted to the Premier Division. Following league reorganisation at the end of the 2018–19 season, the club were placed in the Premier Division West.

Ground
The club played at Tregoodwell until moving to Trefrew Park in 2006.

Honours
South West Peninsula League
Division One West champions 2010–11

Records
Best FA Vase performance: First round, 2015–16

See also

Camelford F.C. players

References

External links

Football clubs in England
Football clubs in Cornwall
Association football clubs established in 1893
1893 establishments in England
East Cornwall League
South Western Football League
South West Peninsula League
Camelford